The Bilbao City Council is the ayuntamiento of Bilbao (Spain). Its headquarter, the Bilbao City Hall, is located in the Ernesto Erkoreka Plaza. The city council is made up of an executive body and a normative municipal plenary. The executive body consists of the mayor and the Governing Junta of the Town of Bilbao. The council performs executive and administrative tasks, and functions in correspondence with the mayor. The junta consists of no more than nine people, its members can be appointed by the mayor.

Municipal administration 
The constituent is elected every four years by universal suffrage. The electoral census is made up of all registered residents in Bilbao over the age of 18 as well as nationals of Spain and other member states of the European Union. According to the General Electoral Regime Law, the number of eligible councilors is based on the population of the municipality.  

The municipal plenary serves to represent the citizenry in the municipal government. It is responsible for the debate and adoption of government policies including: regulations, laws, municipal budgets, urban planning plans, service management, etc. The plenary is made up of 29 councilors and is chaired by the mayor.

Mayoralty 

These are the mayors who have governed the city council since 1979:

The mayor who has held office for the longest time since democracy has been Iñaki Azkuna (14 years) of the Basque Nationalist Party, a position he held from the 1999 elections until his death in 2014, reelected in 2003, 2007 and 2011. Previously, the other mayors who held office for the longest time were Joaquín Zuazagoitia Azcorra (16 years), Josu Ortuondo Larrea (8 years), Pilar Careaga Basabe (6 years), and Federico Moyúa Salazar (6 years).

Electoral results

Political groups 
The councillors form political groups, which are distributed according to their aligned ideologies in the 2019 municipal elections:

Municipal areas and entities served

International recognition 
The annual reports by Transparency International pointed out in 2008, 2009, and 2010, that the City Council was the most "transparent" in Spain in terms of institutional communication, citizen relations, services, public works, and the economy.

In 2010, Bilbao was awarded the Lee Kuan Yew World City Prize, in recognition of the City Council's leadership.

See also 

 Bilbao City Hall
 Bilbao
 Joaquín Rucoba

References

Bibliography

External links 

 Official website of the Bilbao City Council

Bilbao
Basque Government